Euchorthippus chopardi, the Iberian straw grasshopper, is a species of slant-faced grasshopper in the family Acrididae. It is found in Europe.

The IUCN conservation status of Euchorthippus chopardi is "LC", least concern, with no immediate threat to the species' survival. The IUCN status was assessed in 2015.

References

Further reading

External links

 

chopardi
Orthoptera of Europe
Insects described in 1968